Ignis is the fourth album by Swiss violinist Paul Giger recorded in 1998 and released on the ECM label.

Reception
The Allmusic review by Mark W. B. Allender awarded the album 4 stars stating "the pieces on Ignis form a body of old-world sacred music with an avant-garde sensibility".  
In 2011, Ricardo Villalobos and Max Loderbauer used samples of Ignis as the basis for the track "Reshadub" on the remix album Re:ECM.

Track listing
All compositions by Paul Giger except as indicated
 "Organum" (Anonymous) - 6:26   
 "Karma Shadub" - 21:01   
 "Tropus" (Notker Balbulus, Tuotilo) - 14:00   
 "Alleluja" (Notker Balbulus, Tuotilo) - 3:31   
 "O Ignis" (Hildegard von Bingen) - 27:43
Recorded at Niguliste Church, Tallinn in Estonia in June 1998

Personnel
Paul Giger - violin, viola d'amore
Marius Ungureanu - viola (tracks 1 & 3-5)
Beat Schneider - cello (tracks 1 & 3-5)
Estonian Philharmonic Chamber Choir conducted by Tõnu Kaljuste (tracks 2-5)

References

ECM New Series albums
Paul Giger albums
Albums produced by Manfred Eicher
2000 albums